Vespula structor is a species of wasp in the family Vespidae found in India, Nepal, Laos, Myanmar, China and Bhutan.

References

Vespidae
Insects described in 1870